Gümüşpınar can refer to:

 Gümüşpınar, Devrek
 Gümüşpınar, Düzce
 Gümüşpınar, Kalecik